Baba Kundan Singh Memorial Law College is a private law school situated at Dharamkot, Moga in Moga district in the Indian state of Punjab. It offers undergraduate three-year LL.B. and integrated five-years Law courses. The courses are approved by Bar Council of India (BCI), New Delhi and affiliated to Panjab University Chandigarh.

History
Baba Kundan Singh Memorial Law College is named after great Saint Baba Kundan Singh Ji. The college was established in 2007.

References

Law schools in Punjab, India
Educational institutions established in 2007
2007 establishments in Punjab, India